I'm Not Alright may refer to:
 I'm Not Alright (Sanctus Real song)
 I'm Not Alright (Loud Luxury and Bryce Vine song)